Dying Star may refer to:

 Dying Star (album) or the title song, by Ruston Kelly, 2018
 "Dying Star", a song by Ivy from Realistic, 1995